Star Wars Episode I: Racer is a 1999 racing video game based on the podracing sequence featured in Star Wars: Episode I – The Phantom Menace. The game features all of the racers and race course on Tatooine featured in The Phantom Menace. It also adds several new courses, some on Tatooine, others on various planets. Several single player modes, including a tournament mode, are available for play. It also features multiplayer, the format of which varies by platform. Jake Lloyd and Lewis MacLeod, who portrayed Anakin Skywalker and Sebulba in The Phantom Menace, reprise their roles in the game.

Episode I: Racer received generally positive reviews from critics. Several major media outlets listed it as one of the top Star Wars video games. , the game holds the Guinness record as the best-selling sci-fi racing game, having worldwide sales of 3.12 million and beating other series like Wipeout and F-Zero. Two titles featuring podracing were released after Episode I: Racer'''s release. Star Wars: Racer Arcade, an arcade game featuring many similar tracks and characters, was released in 2000. A sequel, Star Wars Racer Revenge was released in 2002 for the PlayStation 2.

Twenty years after the release of the game, it received an HD re-release for PlayStation 4 and Nintendo Switch. It was originally scheduled for May 2020, but was delayed to June 23 due to the COVID-19 pandemic. It was later released on Xbox One on October 27, 2020.

GameplayStar Wars Episode I: Racer features a variety of tracks spanning several different planets. It includes all of the racers featured in the movie as well as additional competitors exclusive to the game. The player character's podracer is equipped with a boost function that the player can activate. While activated the podracer's temperature will rise, and if the player boosts for too long, the engines will explode, destroying the podracer and costing the player several seconds to respawn and continue racing. The podracer will also be destroyed if one or both engines sustain severe damage from colliding into too many walls or obstacles, requiring the player to steer carefully to avoid falling behind. The player can also actively repair the podracer while competing, but doing so slows the podracer until repairs are either complete or stopped.

Three single player game modes are available in the game. In Tournament mode, the player character competes in a championship. Completing races awards money, with higher ranked finishes resulting in higher payouts. This can be used to buy parts or repair droids, unlock new tracks, and unlock new racers. Free Race mode allows the player to practice any previously unlocked courses using any unlocked racer. The player character cannot earn money or unlock tracks and racers, but can set the difficulty of the opponents. Time Attack pits the player character against the clock, racing along to try to achieve the fastest time on the given course. This mode is absent from the PC version. Instead the Free Play mode allows the player to set the number of computer opponents to 0.

Multiplayer is also offered on all platforms, though it differs between the PC and console versions. The Nintendo 64 and Sega Dreamcast versions feature a two player splitscreen mode, while the Windows and Macintosh versions allow for play over a Local Area Network (LAN). This Windows version uses the deprecated IPX protocol to accomplish this, while the Macintosh version uses the TCP/IP stack. The multiplayer mode can support up to eight players.

Development and releaseStar Wars Episode I: Racer was developed and published by LucasArts for Windows PCs in May 1999. Development took approximately two years. Two project leads responsible for Star Wars: Shadows of the Empire began initial development once Shadows was completed. The game was developed in-house at LucasArts. Tools used during development included 3D Studio Max, Alias Wavefront and Autodesk Softimage. During development, multiple graphical application programming interfaces (APIs) were tested, including 3dfx Glide, OpenGL, and Direct3D. Ultimately the game shipped with only Direct3D support because according to Project Lead Brett Tosti when testing Glide and OpenGL the developers "didn’t see any performance increases so didn’t add support." The team had to develop their physics simulation in the game from only a few short clips of the film given to them. According to Tosti, their approximations ended up very close to the film. "We really didn’t get to see how good our estimates were until the very end." Project lead John Knoles emphasized that the team's goal was for a strong sense of speed. He stated they wanted to make it "feel like an eyeball-peeling racing game, where you're going so fast, you're just nervous."

The game was originally titled Star Wars: Podracer, however the subtitle was changed to Episode I Racer when LucasArts learned that another company owned the trademark for games with the name "Pod" in the title. Actor Jake Lloyd, who portrayed Anakin Skywalker in Star Wars Episode I: The Phantom Menace, promoted the game at E3 1999. Lloyd also provided voice-over for his character in the game. The theatrical score from Star Wars: Episode I – The Phantom Menace was reused for the game, and various sound effects from the film were also reused. The podracers were recreated using specifications from the film, and the Tatooine environment was also sourced from the film. Several of the game's other locales had never appeared in a Star Wars game prior. The varied environments, Tosti said, were "to add more depth to the gameplay." During an IGN interview with LucasArts' Tom Byron at E3 1999 the question of online play was brought up. Byron was unsure, citing problems "mostly because of latency issues." Some multiplayer code from Star Wars Jedi Knight: Dark Forces II was utilized for Episode I: Racer. Ultimately internet play was not included. The Windows version uses the deprecated IPX protocol to accomplish this, while the Macintosh version uses the TCP/IP stack. The multiplayer mode can support up to eight players. The game was supported by a 10 million marketing budget.Episode I: Racer was later ported and released for several other platforms: Nintendo 64 Dreamcast, and Game Boy Color. The announced PlayStation version of the game was never released. The Nintendo 64 version received a special edition Star Wars Episode I: Racer hardware bundle, including the standard gray and black console and a copy of the game. Though the Nintendo 64 cartridge could optionally take advantage of Nintendo's Expansion Pak memory unit to display additional textures, the limited capacity of the cartridge resulted in the removal of all pre-rendered cutscenes seen on the Windows and Macintosh versions. It was the first LucasArts game to be released on the Dreamcast. The Game Boy Color release features entirely different game play from its console and PC counterparts. The Game Boy Color hardware is technically incapable of rendering the 3D graphics used in the other versions, so the game instead features one-on-one racing duels on abbreviated, linear tracks using an overhead 2D view. The Game Boy Color version of the game has an additional "rumble" feature, in which a AAA battery may be inserted into the game card to activate vibration.

The game received a digital re-release via the DRM-free digital distribution store GOG.com in May 2018. On October 18, 2019, the Nintendo 64 version was officially re-released in both a standard and Collector's Edition set with approval by Disney and Lucasfilm in limited quantities by Limited Run Games. On March 26, 2020, it was announced that the game would be released for Nintendo Switch and PlayStation 4 in 2020, with a release date of May 12, 2020. The PlayStation 4 version was delayed by two weeks, with a new release date of May 26, 2020. On May 11, 2020, exactly one day before the Nintendo Switch version's release, both the PlayStation 4 and the Nintendo Switch versions were eventually rescheduled for June 23, 2020, release. The Switch version also supports motion controls, allowing players to use them to operate the individual throttles of the podracer's twin engines.

Reception

The game was met with positive to average reception. GameRankings gave it a score of 75.78% for the Nintendo 64 version; 75.42% for the Dreamcast version; 73.79% for the PC version; and 69.44% for the Game Boy Color version. It has been featured on several lists of the best Star Wars video games. In March 2004, GMR rated Episode I: Racer the fifth-best Star Wars game of all time. In 2015, PC Gamer listed it 3rd in their list of top Star Wars games. That same year, it placed 10th in Rock Paper Shotgun's top Star Wars games list. In Game Informer's 2016 list of the 30 best Star Wars video games, Racer ranked 11th. , the game holds the Guinness world record for the best-selling sci-fi racing game, having worldwide sales of 3.12 million and beating other series like Wipeout and F-Zero.Next Generation reviewed the Nintendo 64 version of the game, rating it three stars out of five, and stated that "Yes, it's fast, it's largely customizable, features a lot of options, and it's fun, but it's tough to shake the feeling that if it weren't for the Star Wars license, it wouldn't otherwise stand out."

The editors of Computer Gaming World nominated Racer for their 1999 "Racing Game of the Year" award, which ultimately went to Need for Speed: High Stakes.

During the 3rd Annual AIAS Interactive Achievement Awards (now known as the D.I.C.E. Awards), Star Wars Episode I: Racer won in the category for "Console Racing Game of the Year". Star Wars Episode I: Racer also nominated for the Blockbuster Entertainment Award in the "Favorite Nintendo 64 Game" category, although it lost to Donkey Kong 64.

ReviewsEnvoyer'' (German) (Issue 36 - Oct 1999)

References

External links
Official Nintendo Japan Star Wars Episode I: Racer site

1999 video games
Cancelled PlayStation (console) games
Dreamcast games
Fictional motorsports
Science fiction racing games
Game Boy Color games
Interactive Achievement Award winners
LucasArts games
Classic Mac OS games
Multiplayer and single-player video games
Nintendo 64 games
Nintendo games
Pax Softnica games
Star Wars: Episode I – The Phantom Menace video games
Video games developed in the United States
Windows games
Nintendo Switch games
Aspyr games
PlayStation 4 games
Video games postponed due to the COVID-19 pandemic
Xbox One games
D.I.C.E. Award for Racing Game of the Year winners